The 2014 women's road cycling season was the third for the Orica–AIS team, which began as GreenEDGE-AIS in 2012.

Roster

Ages as of 1 January 2014.

*On June 17, the team announced the signing of Katrin Garfoot for the remainder of the 2014 season.

Riders who joined the team for the 2014 season

Riders who left the team during or after the 2013 season

Season victories

Results in major races

Single day races

Grand Tours

References

2014 UCI Women's Teams seasons
2014 in Australian sport
2014